The Millennium Tower is a 35-storey condominium within the city of George Town in Penang, Malaysia. A low density development, the condominium contains only 20 residential units within its 35 floors.

See also
List of tallest buildings in George Town
 Gurney Drive

References 

Buildings and structures in George Town, Penang
Residential skyscrapers in Malaysia
2005 establishments in Malaysia
Buildings and structures completed in 2005